The 1976 Uganda National League was the ninth season of the Ugandan football championship, the top-level football league of Uganda.

Overview
The 1976 Uganda National League was contested by 12 teams and was won by Kampala City Council FC.

League standings

Leading goalscorer
The top goalscorer in the 1976 season was John Ntesibe of Express FC with 22 goals.

References

External links
Uganda - List of Champions - RSSSF (Hans Schöggl)
Ugandan Football League Tables - League321.com

Ugandan Super League seasons
Uganda
Uganda
1